A Royal Wedding Suite is a 1981 album by Oscar Peterson. Arranged by Rick Wilkins, Peterson's jazz suite commemorates the 1981 wedding of Charles, Prince of Wales and Lady Diana Spencer at St Paul's Cathedral.

Track listing
 "Announcement" – 1:27
 "London Gets Ready" – 5:39
 "When Summer Comes" – 6:01
 "It's On" – 5:38
 "Heraldry" – 4:15
 "Royal Honeymoon" – 3:46
 "Jubilation" – 3:56
 "Lady Di's Waltz" – 5:01
 "Let the World Sing" – 5:35
 "The Empty Cathedral" – 3:39

All music composed by Oscar Peterson.

Personnel

Performance
 Oscar Peterson – piano, electric piano
 Rick Wilkins – arranger, conductor

References

1981 albums
Oscar Peterson albums
Albums produced by Norman Granz
Pablo Records albums